Rowan Thomson is a professor in the Department of Physics at Carleton University and Assistant Dean (Equity, Diversity and Inclusion) in the Faculty of Science. She is a Canada Research Chair in Radiotherapy Physics.

Background and education 
Thomson received a Double BSc degree in Honours Mathematics and Physics from Carleton University. She earned her PhD from Perimeter Institute and the University of Waterloo in 2007 where she studied Superstring Theory.

Career 
Thomson's research focuses on developing computational and theoretical techniques to study the interactions of radiation with matter, including radiation transport and energy deposition at or below the cellular level, multiscale modeling, and fundamental dosimetry. She has also developed the software package egs_brachy, an open-source Monte Carlo simulator of brachytherapy.

References 

Academic staff of Carleton University
Canadian physicists
Year of birth missing (living people)
Canadian women physicists
Place of birth missing (living people)
Living people
Women physicists
Canada Research Chairs